The 2013 Euroleague Final Four was the concluding Final Four tournament of the 2012–13 Euroleague season. It was held from 10 May till 12 May 2013, at The O2 Arena in London. The Greek League club Olympiacos, successfully defended their EuroLeague title from the previous season, after defeating Real Madrid in the Final.

Vassilis Spanoulis won his second consecutive Final Four MVP, and the third of his career. Spanoulis joined Toni Kukoč, as the only player to have ever won the award three times.

Venue
On May 12, 2012, it was announced that the Final Four would be hosted at The O2 Arena in London, England. The O2 Arena is a multi-purpose indoor arena that is located in the centre of The O2 entertainment complex, on the Greenwich Peninsula, in south-east London. It is named after its primary sponsor, the telecommunications company O2.

The O2 Arena is the world's largest building as measured by floor space, and has the second-highest seating capacity of any indoor venue in the United Kingdom, behind the Manchester Arena, but it took the crown of the world's busiest music arena from New York City's Madison Square Garden in 2008. The closest underground station to the venue is the North Greenwich station, on the Jubilee line.

Bracket

Semifinals

CSKA Moscow vs. Olympiacos

FC Barcelona Regal vs. Real Madrid

Third–place game

Final
After the end of the opening quarter, Madrid led Olympiacos by 17 points. However, the Reds managed to get back in the game, and the game was tied by the end of the third quarter. Behind Spanoulis, Olympiacos pulled away in the fourth quarter.

References

External links
Official Site

Final Four
2012–13
2012–13 in Greek basketball
2012–13 in Russian basketball
2012–13 in Spanish basketball
2012–13 in British basketball
International basketball competitions hosted by the United Kingdom
International sports competitions in London
Basketball in London
May 2013 sports events in the United Kingdom